Tsitondroina is a town and commune in Madagascar. It belongs to the district of Ikalamavony, which is a part of Haute Matsiatra Region. The population of the commune was estimated to be approximately 30,000 in 2001 commune census.

Only primary schooling is available. The majority 52% of the population of the commune are farmers, while an additional 48% receives their livelihood from raising livestock. The most important crop is rice, while other important products are beans, maize, cassava and onions.

References and notes 

Populated places in Haute Matsiatra